Ray Wyre (2 November 1951 – 20 June 2008) was a pioneer in the treatment of sex offenders.

Born in Hampshire, his work as a probation officer in prisons  brought him into contact with some of Britain's most dangerous violent and sexual offenders, including Reggie Kray and Robert Black. He set up the first residential treatment centre for sex offenders, the Gracewell Clinic, in 1988 in Birmingham.

Wyre had three children, all from his first marriage, which ended in divorce. He died of a stroke and was survived by his wife Charmaine and his children.

Bibliography
 Women, Men & Rape (1990), with Anthony Swift
 The Murder of Childhood: Inside the Mind of One of Britain’s Most Notorious Child Murderers (2nd edition, 2018), with Tim Tate

References

1951 births
2008 deaths
British criminologists
English crime writers
English non-fiction writers
People from Hampshire
Place of death missing
English male non-fiction writers
Probation and parole officers
20th-century English male writers